Stone Cross may refer to:

Stone cross, a type of monument
The Stone Cross, a novel by Vasyl Stefanyk
Stone Cross, Crowborough, an area in Crowborough, East Sussex, England
Stone Cross, Wadhurst, an area in Wadhurst, East Sussex, England
Stone Cross, Westham, a village in Westham, near Pevensey, East Sussex, England
Stone Cross, Ashford, a location in Kent district, England
Stone Cross, Dover, a location in Kent, England
Stone Cross, Tunbridge Wells, Kent, England
Stone Cross, West Midlands, an area in the Metropolitan Borough of Sandwell, in the West Midlands, England